Alderman Charles Pakenham Buchanan (9 November 1874 – 22 September 1924) was Mayor of Brisbane, Queensland, Australia from 1909 for two terms.

Charles Pakenham Buchanan was born in Brisbane, Queensland, Australia on 9 November 1874 to John Alfred Buchanan (born Enniskillen, Fermanagh, Ireland 1843 - Brisbane 1886) and Jessie Jane Fraser (born Brisbane 14 December 1849 - Brisbane 1944).

He was educated at St. Joseph's College, Gregory Terrace in Brisbane. He attended the University of Sydney where he graduated with a B.A. in 1900.

He married Elsie Waverley Newman, daughter of the well known photographer John Hubert Newman in Sydney, New South Wales, Australia in 1899.

He had four sons (John Pakenham Buchanan, Reginald Patrick Pakenham Buchanan, Joseph MacKenzie Pakenham Buchanan and Hilary Packenham Buchanan) and 2 daughters (Marie Packenham Buchanan and Jean Jessie Pakenham Buchanan).

He was an alderman on the Brisbane City Council from 1904 - 1921. He was Mayor of Brisbane during two terms, from 1908 and from 1918 to 1919.

Charles Pakenham Buchanan died in Brisbane on 22 September 1924. He is buried in the Toowong Cemetery.

Photographs 
Alderman in 1908
Alderman in 1915
Charles in Academic dress

Sources
Buchanan, Charles Pakenham — Brisbane City Council Grave Location Search

External links

Mayors and Lord Mayors of Brisbane
1874 births
1924 deaths
Burials at Toowong Cemetery